Senator Alauya Alonto was a Muslim Filipino statesman from Lanao best known for being a Delegate to the Constitutional Convention of 1934, and a two term senator of the Philippines, serving from 1942–1946 and 1946–1949.

Early life and education 
Alonto was born in Ramain, Lanao, shortly before the outbreak of the Spanish–American War. His father was Datu Alonto of Maul, Marantao; and his mother was Bae Dayang Dayang Adiong of Ditsaan-Ramain.
  
He studied under the tutelage of Hadji Nosca Aloz, the highest Pandita of Lanao and took up Arabic literature and jurisprudence.

Career 
In 1912 he became Sultan of Ramain. Inspired by the cause of freedom, he organized the "Filipinista" party in Lanao.

He was appointed Municipal Manager under the Philippine Independence Commission in 1924, as special representative for Lanao, by then Governor-General Frank Murray, and was elected Delegate to the Constitutional Convention in 1934.

He served as a senator for two terms: 1942–1946 and 1946–1949.

Family and descendants 
Sultan Alonto Alauya married the Bae Bariga Alangadi of Ramain, by whom he had six children:
 Senator Domocao Alonto; 
 Hadja Naima Alonto; 
 Governor and Ambassador Abdul Ghafur Madki Alonto; 
 Masiding Alonto, Sr.;
 Governor Princess Tarhata Alonto-Lucman; and 
 Madrigal Alonto.

References

Nacionalista Party politicians
Senators of the 1st Congress of the Philippines
Senators of the 1st Congress of the Commonwealth of the Philippines
People from Lanao del Sur
Filipino Muslims